The 1st annual Cannes Film Festival was held from 20 September to 5 October 1946. Twenty-one countries presented their films at the "First Cannes International Film Festival", which took place at the former Casino of Cannes. Only one year after the end of World War II, most of the films were about the war. There arose several technical issues, such as the tarpauline cover blowing away in a storm  on the day before the winners were to be announced, the reels of Alfred Hitchcock’s Notorious shown in reverse order, and Miguel M. Delgado’s The Three Musketeers projected upside-down.

During the first festival, the jury was made up of one representative per country, with French historian Georges Huisman as the Jury President. With more emphasis on creativity than in competitiveness, eighteen nations presented their films. Eleven of them tied for the first Grand Prix of the International Festival.

Jury  
The following people were appointed as the Jury for the feature and short films:
Georges Huisman (France) (historian) Jury President
Iris Barry (USA)
Beaulieu (Canada)
Antonin Brousil (Czechoslovakia)
J.H.J. De Jong (Netherlands)
Don Tudor (Romania)
Samuel Findlater (UK)
Sergei Gerasimov (Soviet Union)
Jan Korngold (Poland)
Domingos Mascarenhas (Portugal)
Hugo Mauerhofer (Switzerland)
Filippo Mennini (Italy)
Moltke-Hansen (Norway)
Fernand Rigot (Belgium)
Kjell Stromberg (Sweden)
Rodolfo Usigli (Mexico)
Youssef Wahby (Egypt)
Helge Wamberg (Denmark)

Competition
The following films competed for the Grand Prix:

 The Adventurous Bachelor by Otakar Vávra
 Anna and the King of Siam by John Cromwell
 The Bandit by Alberto Lattuada
 The Battle of the Rails by René Clément
 Beauty and the Beast by Jean Cocteau
 Blood and Fire by Anders Henrikson
 Brief Encounter by David Lean
 Caesar and Cleopatra by Gabriel Pascal
 Camões by José Leitão de Barros
 The Captive Heart by Basil Dearden
 Dunia by Mohammed Karim
 The Queen's Flower by  Paul Călinescu
 Gaslight by George Cukor
 Gilda by Charles Vidor
 Un giorno nella vita by Alessandro Blasetti
 Girl No. 217 by Mikhail Romm
 The Great Glinka by  Lev Arnshtam
 Hello Moscow! by Sergei Yutkevich
 His Young Wife by Mario Soldati
 The Last Chance by  Leopold Lindtberg
 Letter from the Dead by Johan Jacobsen
 The Lost Weekend by Billy Wilder
 A Lover's Return by Christian-Jaque
 The Lovers by Giacomo Gentilomo
 The Magic Bow by Bernard Knowles
 Make Mine Music by Joshua Meador, Clyde Geronimi, Jack Kinney, Robert Cormack, Hamilton Luske
 María Candelaria by Emilio Fernández
 Men Without Wings by  František Čáp
 Mr. Orchid by René Clément
 Neecha Nagar by Chetan Anand
 Notorious by Alfred Hitchcock
 Patrie by Louis Daquin
 The Red Meadows by Bodil Ipsen, Lau Lauritzen Jr.
 Rhapsody in Blue by Irving Rapper
 Rome, Open City by Roberto Rossellini
 The Seventh Veil by  Compton Bennett
 The Stone Flower by  Aleksandr Ptushko
 Pastoral Symphony by Jean Delannoy
 Torment by Alf Sjöberg
 Três Dias Sem Deus by  Bárbara Virgínia
 The Three Musketeers by Miguel M. Delgado
 The Turning Point by Fridrikh Ermler
 Wonder Man by H. Bruce Humberstone
 Zoya by  Lev Arnshtam

Short films
The following short films were selected for the Grand Prix du court métrage:

 A City Sings by Gudrun Parker
 Aubervilliers by Eli Lotar
 Aubusson by Pierre Biro, Pierre Hirsch
 Bambini in città by Luigi Comencini
 Belyy klyk by Aleksandr Zguridi
 Fall of Berlin – 1945 by Yuli Raizman, Yelizaveta Svilova
 Cantico Dei Marm by Pietro Benedetti, Giovanni Rossi
 Chants populaires by George Dunning
 Chercheurs de la mer by Jean Palardy
 Cyprus Is an Island by Ralph Keene
 Des hommes comme les autres by R. Van De Weerdt
 Die Welt by Sam Winston
 En Route by Otto van Meyenhoff
 Épaves by Jacques-Yves Cousteau
 Flicker Flashbacks by Richard Fleischer
 G.I'S In Switzerland by Hermann Haller
 Handling Ships by Allan Crick, John Halas
 Hitler Lives by Don Siegel
 Instruments of the Orchestra by Muir Mathieson
 Jeux d'enfants by Jean Painlevé
 L'Homme by Gilles Margaritis
 La cité des abeilles by Andrev Winnitski
 La Flûte magique by Paul Grimault
 La Locomotive by Stanisław Urbanowicz
 Le Goéland by Willy Peters
 Le Retour à la Vie by Dr K.M. Vallo
 Les Digues en construction by Jo de Haas, Mannus Franken
 Les Halles De Paris by Paul Schuitema
 Les mines de sel de Wieliczka by Jarosław Brzozowski
 Les Ponts De La Meuse by Paul Schuitema
 Les Protubérance solaires by M. Leclerc, M. Lyot
 Lucerne Ville Musicale by Hans Trommer
 Man One Family by Ivor Montagu
 Me he de comer esa tune by Miguel Zacharias
 Metamorphoses by Herman van der Horst
 Molodost nashey strany by Sergei Yutkevich
 Open drop ether by Basil Wright
 Out of the Ruins by Nick Read
 Parques Infantis by Aquilino Mendes, João Mendes
 Partie de campagne by Jean Renoir
 Springman and the SS by Jiří Trnka
 Prisonnier de guerre by Kurt Früh
 Rapsodia rustica by Jean Mihail
 Réseau x by Mahuzier
 Steel by Frank Bundy
 Suite Varsovienne by Tadeusz Makarczyński
 The Life Cycle of the Onion by Mary Field
 The Purloined Pup by Charles August Nichols
 The Way We Live by Jill Craigie
 Un Port En Plein Coeur De L'Europe by Jaroslav Novotny
 Vánoční sen by Karel Zeman
 Wet Paint by Walt Disney
 World Of Plenty by Paul Rotha
 Your Children's eyes by Alex Strasser
 Zvírátka a petrovstí by Jiří Trnka

Awards
The following films and people received the 1946 awards:

Official awards
Feature Films
Grand Prix du Festival International du Film:
Brief Encounter by David Lean
Hets by Alf Sjöberg
The Last Chance by Leopold Lindtberg
The Lost Weekend by Billy Wilder
María Candelaria (Xochimilco) by Emilio Fernández
Men Without Wings by Frantisek Cáp
Neecha Nagar by Chetan Anand
Red Meadows by Bodil Ipsen and Lau Lauritzen Jr.
Rome, Open City by Roberto Rossellini
La symphonie pastorale by Jean Delannoy
Velikiy perelom by Fridrikh Ermler
International Jury Prize: La Bataille du rail by René Clément
Best Actor: Ray Milland for The Lost Weekend
Best Actress: Michèle Morgan for La symphonie pastorale
Best Director: René Clément for La Bataille du rail
Best Cinematography: Gabriel Figueroa for María Candelaria (Xochimilco) and Los tres mosqueteros
Best Animation Design: Make Mine Music
Best Colour: The Stone Flower
Short Films
Vánoční sen by Karel Zeman
Zvírátka a petrovstí by Jiří Trnka
Molodost nashey strany by Sergei Yutkevich
Les mines de sel de Wieliczka by Jarosław Brzozowski
La cité des abeilles by Andrev Winnitski
Épaves by Jacques-Yves Cousteau
Fall of Berlin – 1945 by Yuli Raizman

Independent awards
FIPRESCI Prize
  by Georges Rouquier
International Peace Award
 The Last Chance

References

Media

British Pathé: Cannes Film Festival 1946 footage
Institut National de l'Audiovisuel: Opening of the 1st Festival in 1946 (commentary in French)
INA: About the 1946 Festival (mute)
INA: Unusual arrival of American stars at the 1st festival (mute)

External links 
1946 Cannes Film Festival (web.archive)
Official website Retrospective 1946 
Cannes Film Festival Awards for 1946 at Internet Movie Database

Cannes Film Festival, 1946
Cannes Film Festival, 1946
Cannes Film Festival
1946 film festivals